The Cwm, Llantrisant, Monmouthshire is a farmhouse dating from the 16th century. Expanded in both the 17th and 18th centuries, The Cwm is a Grade II* listed building, its listing describing it as "a substantial farmhouse of distinctive T-plan".

History and description
Sir Cyril Fox and Lord Raglan, in their three-volume guide Monmouthshire Houses, give an original construction date of the late 16th century, with the roof of the main Tudor block dating from 1600. They ascribe the wing to the South to the early 17th and 18th centuries, with Cadw ascribing the North wing to the same 18th century building phase. Fox and Raglan consider the style of the structure indicates a national, rather than a regional, influence. The architectural historian John Newman notes the stone window frames, with recessed spandrels and arched windows, which he considers "most unusual". Nothing is known of the builders or early owners. The house remains in private ownership and is Grade II* listed.

Built over 200 years, the house is of a T-plan design, with a central block and two wings. Constructed of whitewashed rubble to a height of two storeys, the roofs have been replaced with modern tiles.

Notes

Sources
 
 

Grade II* listed buildings in Monmouthshire
Country houses in Monmouthshire
Grade II* listed houses